This article is a list of Justice Michael Moldaver's written judgments during his tenure as puisne justice of the Supreme Court of Canada.

2012 

{| width=100%
|-
|
{| width=100% align=center cellpadding=0 cellspacing=0
|-
! bgcolor=#CCCCCC | Statistics
|-
|

2013

{| width=100%
|-
|
{| width=100% align=center cellpadding=0 cellspacing=0
|-
! bgcolor=#CCCCCC | Statistics
|-
|

2014 

{| width=100%
|-
|
{| width=100% align=center cellpadding=0 cellspacing=0
|-
! bgcolor=#CCCCCC | 2014 statistics
|-
|

2015 

{| width=100%
|-
|
{| width=100% align=center cellpadding=0 cellspacing=0
|-
! bgcolor=#CCCCCC | Statistics
|-
|

 Canada (AG) v Federation of Law Societies of Canada, 2015 SCC 7 (Dissent - Concurrence) 
 Loyola High School v Quebec (AG), 2015 SCC 12 (Dissent - Concurrence) 
 R v Nur, 2015 SCC 15 (Dissent) 
 Henry v British Columbia (AG), 2015 SCC 24 (Majority) 
 R v Kokopenace, 2015 SCC 28 (Majority) 
 R v Tatton, 2015 SCC 33 (Unanimous) 
 R v Rodgerson, 2015 SCC 38 (Unanimous) 
 R v Simpson, 2015 SCC 40 (Unanimous) 
 Wilson v British Columbia (Superintendent of Motor Vehicles), 2015 SCC 47 (Unanimous) 
 Kanthasamy v Canada (Citizen and Immigration), 2015 SCC 61 (Dissent)

2016 
 R v Seruhungo, 2016 SCC 2 (Dissent) 
 R v Spicer, 2016 SCC 3 (Unanimous) 
 Carter v Canada (AG), 2016 SCC 4 (Dissent - Concurrence) 
 World Bank Group v Wallace, 2016 SCC 15 (Unanimous) 
 R v Saeed, 2016 SCC 24 (Majority) 
 R v Vassell, 2016 SCC 26 (Unanimous) 
 R v Jordan, 2016 SCC 27 (Majority) 
 R v Williamson, 2016 SCC 28 (Majority) 
 R v Anthony-Cook, 2016 SCC 43 (Majority) 
 Morasse v Nadeau-Dubois, 2016 SCC 44 (Concurrence) 
 Windsor (City of) v Canadian Transit Co, 2016 SCC 54 (Dissent)

2017 
{| width=100%
|-
|
{| width=100% align=center cellpadding=0 cellspacing=0
|-
! bgcolor=#CCCCCC | Michael Moldaver 2017 statistics
|-
|

See also 
 2012 Decisions: CanLII 2012 Reasons of the Supreme Court of Canada  
 2013 Decisions: CanLII 2013 Reasons of the Supreme Court of Canada  
 2014 Decisions: CanLII 2014 Reasons of the Supreme Court of Canada 
 2015 Decisions: CanLII 2015 Reasons of the Supreme Court of Canada 
 2016 Decisions: CanLII 2016 Reasons of the Supreme Court of Canada 
 2017 Decisions: CanLII 2017 Reasons of the Supreme Court of Canada

References 

 

 Moldaver